Ansley is a village and civil parish in the North Warwickshire district of Warwickshire, England. The parish includes the village of Ansley, Ansley Common, Church End, Ansley Hall, Birchley Heath, and formerly Ansley Hall Colliery. The village is near Arley and Astley. The parish church of St Lawrence is Norman in origin and lies outside the main village at Church End. It is a Grade II* listed building. The church includes stained glass by Karl Parsons. Ansley Hall dates from the early eighteenth century. It was taken over by the Ansley Hall Coal and Iron Company, founded by William Garside Phillips, the great grandfather of Captain Mark Phillips.

The village was called "Hanslei" in the Domesday Book of 1086 and gives details that the land was owned by Lady Godiva. The village now only has one pub called the Lord Nelson Inn which is also home to a micro-brewery. The Boot Inn was damaged by a fire and now serves as a private residence although the pubs signage is still visible. The former Ansley Social Club closed on Boxing Day in 2016 and has since been demolished to make way for a small housing development.

References

External links
 
 

Villages in Warwickshire
Borough of North Warwickshire